Posti can refer to:

 Posti (1950 film), a Punjabi film
 Posti Group, the Finnish national post office
 Posti, Estonia, a place in south-eastern Estonia
Posti SA, tea company in Poland
 Posti (2022 film), a Punjabi film